There are about thirty theatres in Florence, Italy (not counting those already closed or dismantled), and range from historic theatres, to national and municipal music halls.

There are four theaters devoted to classical music and opera (Comunale, Verdi, Pergola and Goldoni).
Many citizens and tourists regularly visit these theatre halls, with over six hundred thousand tickets sold per season, compared with just under four hundred thousand residents.

List

See also
 Music of Florence

References
 Garbero Zorzi, Elvira and Luigi Zangheri, eds. (1998). I Teatri storici della Toscana. Marsilio Editori.